Irbisia brachycera is a species of plant bug in the family Miridae. It is found in Central America and North America.

References

Further reading

 

Articles created by Qbugbot
Insects described in 1872
Mirini
Hemiptera of North America
Hemiptera of Central America